The Houtkopersburgwal is a short secondary canal in Amsterdam. It is located in the east of the Amsterdam-Centrum district in the Lastage neighborhood.

Location

The Houtkopersburgwal connects the Oudeschans to the Uilenburgergracht around the island of Uilenburg.
It constitutes the southwest limit of this island.
Its route is parallel to that of Rapenburgwal, which defines the northeast border of the island. 
The canal is crossed by the Nieuwe Uilenburgerstraat via Bridge 291, Steenvoetsluis, in the center of its length.

The canal was dug following construction of the Uilenburgergracht in 1593 in order to link it to the Oudeschans.
A 1737 map shows that the canal once ran further east to the Markengracht.
This was back-filled in 1968 during construction of the IJtunnel.
In the nineteenth century, the newly created islands of Uilenburg and Valkenburg (aka Marken) were the poorest neighborhoods of the Jodenbuurt (Jewish quarter).

See also 
Canals of Amsterdam

Notes

Sources

Canals in Amsterdam